Dwayne Benjamin Didon (born September 11, 1994) is a Seychellois swimmer, who specialized in sprint freestyle events. At age thirteen, Didon became the youngest male swimmer at the 2008 Summer Olympics, representing the island of Seychelles. He swam in the third heat of the men's 50 m freestyle event, finishing in fourth place, and eighty-fifth overall, with a time of 28.95 seconds.

References

External links
NBC Olympics Profile

1994 births
Living people
Seychellois male freestyle swimmers
Olympic swimmers of Seychelles
Swimmers at the 2008 Summer Olympics